Kofa may refer to:

 Kofa National Wildlife Refuge, established in Arizona in 1939 to protect desert bighorn sheep
 Korean Film Archive, also known as the Korean Federation of Film Archives, founded in Seoul in 1974
 Kofa Mountains, a mountain range in Southwest Arizona named for the King of Arizona gold mine
 Kofa High School, a public secondary school in Yuma, Arizona
 KOFA (AM), a radio station (1320 AM) licensed to serve Yuma, Arizona, United States